The 1935–36 Notre Dame Fighting Irish men's basketball team represented the University of Notre Dame during the 1935–36 NCAA men's basketball season in the United States. The head coach was George Keogan, coaching in his 13th season with the Fighting Irish. The team finished the season with a 22–2–1 record (their only tie in program history) and were named national champions by the Helms Athletic Foundation. Players John Moir and Paul Nowak were named consensus All-Americans at the end of the season as well.

Schedule and results

|-
!colspan=9 style="background:#002649; color:#CC9933;"| Regular season

Source

References

Notre Dame Fighting Irish men's basketball seasons
Notre Dame
NCAA Division I men's basketball tournament championship seasons
Notre Dame Fighting Irish Men's Basketball Team
Notre Dame Fighting Irish Men's Basketball Team